Cosmianthemum is a genus of flowering plants belonging to the family Acanthaceae.

Its native range is Thailand, Western Malesia.

Species:

Cosmianthemum angustifolium 
Cosmianthemum anomalum 
Cosmianthemum brookeae 
Cosmianthemum bullatum 
Cosmianthemum dido 
Cosmianthemum guangxiense 
Cosmianthemum knoxiifolium 
Cosmianthemum latifolium 
Cosmianthemum magnifolium 
Cosmianthemum obtusifolium 
Cosmianthemum punctulatum 
Cosmianthemum subglabrum 
Cosmianthemum viriduliflorum

References

Acanthaceae
Acanthaceae genera